The term Torke may refer to:

Place
 Torke, a village in India celebrated for its salt production

Surname
 Michael Torke (1961 - ), American composer